Kombumerri Park (known commercially as Subaru Oval) is a multi-sports venue in Mermaid Waters, a suburb in the Gold Coast, Australia. It includes an Australian Rules Football and Cricket ground.

It has been used by the NEAFL's Broadbeach Australian Football Club team as their home game base. The Gold Coast Suns reserves side also occasionally uses the ground for home matches.

The Geelong Cats senior side has used the ground for training in July 2017, with thousands of spectators coming along to watch them.

See also

 Sports on the Gold Coast, Queensland

References

Australian rules football grounds
Cricket grounds in Australia
Sports venues on the Gold Coast, Queensland
North East Australian Football League grounds